Thomas Ramos may refer to:
Thomas Ramos (rugby union) (born 1995), French international rugby union player
Thomas Ramos (soccer) (born 1992), American soccer player
Thomas Vincent Ramos (1887–1955), Belizean civil rights activist